La Camperona (altitude ) is a mountain in the Cantabrian Mountains, near Sabero in the Province of León, Spain.

The mountain pass, which gives access to the summit, has the same name.

Cycling

The mountain has been used several times for stage finishes in the Vuelta a España. Beyond Sotillos de Sabero, the climb has a maximum gradient of 19.5%.

References

External links

La Camperona at Altimetrias.net (in Spanish)

Mountains of Spain
Cantabrian Mountains
Climbs in cycle racing in Spain